The Ponoară is a right tributary of the river Corogea in Romania. It flows into the Corogea near Tudor Vladimirescu.

References

Rivers of Romania
Rivers of Botoșani County